The Borzecki 2RB is a Polish air-cooled, four-cylinder, horizontally opposed, two-stroke, piston engine designed and built by Jozef Borzecki for use in motor gliders. First bench tested in 1970 the 2RB can be used in both tractor and pusher configuration, and the  engine was first flown in 1972 in his own design motor glider, the Borzecki Alto-Stratus.

Application
 Borzecki Alto-Stratus

Specifications

See also

References

Notes

Bibliography

1970s aircraft piston engines